General Internet Corpus of Russian (GICR) is a corpus of Russian internet texts that has been accessible on request through an online query interface since 2013. The corpus includes rich text materials from the blogosphere, social networks, major news sources and literary magazines.

Goals of the project 

The project has the status of an educational and scientific one, and many tasks of computational linguistics are solved by independent researchers and research groups with the materials obtained by GICR. 
While other corpus projects of Russian are focused on fiction and edited texts, General Internet Corpus provides linguists timely opportunity to learn the language as it is, with all the slang and regional peculiarities.

Corpus gives the opportunity to carry out research in
 Linguistic research of a wide range: dialectological research, study of word distribution, study of the language of the social networks, study of the influence of gender, age and other factors on the language, frequency of words, fixed expressions and different constructions, stylistic features of texts of different segments of the Internet, etc.
 Social media analysis 
 Corpus-based machine learning for evaluating automatic tagging

At various times, student papers and independent researches were carried out on the project material by students, graduates and employees of MSU, MIPT, Russian State Humanitarian University, Novosibirsk State University, Higher School of Economics, Russian Academy of Sciences, SFU, CSU, SGMP, IAAS of MSU.

Scientific project leaders:
Belikov V. - RSUH, Moscow, Russia
Selegey V. - RSUH, ABBYY, Moscow, Russia
Sharoff S. - RSUH, Moscow, Russia; University of Leeds, UK

The organizations involved in support of GICR: 
 Russian State University of Humanities
 ABBYY Company
 Moscow Institute of Physics and Technology
 Skolkovo Institute of Science and Technology

Size and content of the corpus 

Corpus size for the summer 2016 is 19.8 billion tokens, of which 49% are from VKontakte, 40% are from LiveJournal, another 4% - from Mail.ru Blogs and News, and 2% - from Russian Magazine Hall.
The sources collected in news segment are: RIA Novosti, Regnum, Lenta.ru, Rosbalt.
Texts are provided with metamarkup (by date of creation of the text, sex, place and year of birth of the author, Internet genre, etc.); all texts are provided with automatic morphological tagging and lemmatization.
Most of the texts collected are of 2013–2014 years of creation, although in some segments, such as in Russian Magazine Hall, there are some texts collected since 1994.

GICR is one of the few mega-corpora projects nowadays, which means its available size is reaching several billion of words.

Access 

Currently the interface of GICR is in beta stage, so access to the search in the corpora is provided and is free, but is available for researchers on request.

See also 

 Text corpus
 Corpus linguistics
 Russian National Corpus
 Internet linguistics

References

Further reading 

Belikov V., Kopylov N., Piperski A., Selegey V., Sharoff S., (2013), Big and diverse is beautiful: A large corpus of Russian to study linguistic variation. In  Web as Corpus Workshop (WAC-8).
Lagutin M. B., Katinskaya A. Y., Selegey V. P., Sharoff S., Sorokin A. A. (2015) Automatic Classification of Web Texts Using Functional Text Dimensions. In  Dialogue, Russian International Conference on Computational Linguistics, Bekasovo
Katinskaya A., Sharoff S. (2015) Applying Multi-dimensional Analysis to a Russian Webcorpus: Searching for Evidence of Genres , in Proc. of the Workshop on Balto-Slavic Natural Language Processing associated with the International Conference RANLP, Hissar, Bulgaria.

External links 

• Official site of GICR

Applied linguistics
Russian language
Corpus linguistics
Linguistic research
Corpora